Cao Baoping is a Chinese film director. He has emerged in recent years as a figure in China's "midrange" cinema industry. Some industry watchers, like Variety, have situated directors like Cao between the older fifth generation directors, such as Chen Kaige or Zhang Yimou, who have achieved major international and box-office success, and the more "underground" sixth generation directors, like Jia Zhangke and Wang Xiaoshuai.

Directorial career
Cao Baoping graduated from the Beijing Film Academy in 1989, and spent most of the 1990s teaching screenwriting at his alma mater. Cao would go on to expand into directing television and television films, co-directing the television film Absolute Emotion in 2001.

His solo debut as director was 2006's Trouble Makers, a satirical black comedy about a village taking revenge on a gang of hoodlums. Due to its rough content, Trouble Makers faced a host of problems from censors and spent six years in gestation before finally being released. The film premiered at the 2006 Shanghai International Film Festival, where it was called by Variety's Derek Elley as a standout entry.

In 2008, Cao followed up Trouble Makers with The Equation of Love and Death, starring Zhou Xun. The film was well received and Cao would win a best new director award at the San Sebastian International Film Festival for his efforts.

Filmography

References

External links
 
 Cao Baoping at the Chinese Movie Database
 Cao Baoping at Variety.com

Film directors from Shanxi
Beijing Film Academy alumni
Year of birth missing (living people)
Living people
Screenwriters from Shanxi
People from Datong